The Mount St. Mary's Mountaineers men's soccer team represents Mount St. Mary's University participating in the Metro Atlantic Athletic Conference. The sport was discontinued following the 2012 season for financial reasons but resumed in 2018.

Coaching history 
Source=

Record
Reference

Awards 
Source=

NEC Coach of the Year
  Rob Ryerson (2008)

NEC Rookie of the Year
  Zoncher Dennis (2011)
  Chris Wheeler (2008)
  Niall Lepper (1999)

First Team All-Conference

  Zoncher Dennis (2011)
  Eric Detzel (2010)
  Chris Wheeler (2009 & 2010)
  Vinnie Berry (2008)
  Howdy Long (2006)
  Luke Strutt (2003)
  Brandon Scarfield (2002)
  Simon Hodkin (2008)
  Niall Lepper (1999)
  Rob Ray (1999)

Second Team All-Conference

  Zoncher Dennis (2012)
  Ian Hendrie (2011)
  Eric Detzel (2009)
  Chris Wheeler (2008 & 2011)
  Vinnie Berry (2006)
  Mark Murphy (2006)
  Kurt Borell (2003)
  Matt Moneymaker  (2000)
  Chris Hallat (2000)
  Rob Ray (2000)
  Chris Hallat   (1999)
  Duncan Gladwin (1998 & 1999)
  Boris Nana-Tonzi (2018)
 Daniel Gerard (1998)
 Mark Southern (1997)
 Simon Hodkin (1997)

References

External links